The 1924 Winter Olympics, officially known as the I Olympic Winter Games, and known at the time as Semaine Internationale des Sports d'Hiver ("International Winter Sports Week"), was a winter multi-sport event held in Chamonix, France, from 25 January to 5 February 1924. Norway topped the table, collecting seventeen medals in total, including four gold, three of which were won by Thorleif Haug in the Nordic combined and cross-country skiing events. Norway also achieved two podium sweeps, winning all three medals in both the 50 km cross-country skiing and the Nordic combined. This remained a record at the Winter Olympics until 2014.

When it was held, the games were not formally recognised as being the Olympics, but acknowledged that they were held under the "high patronage of the International Olympic Committee". Partly due to this, varying figures are reported for the number of participants. The International Olympic Committee (IOC) website suggests that 258 athletes from 16 nations participated in 16 events across 9 sports. In contrast, the Sports-Reference website lists 313 participants from 19 countries. Bill Mallon, a prominent Olympic Games historian, quotes a figure of 291 competitors in his Historical Dictionary of the Olympic Movement. Meanwhile, the official report for the 1924 Summer and Winter Olympics listed 293 athletes from 17 nations.

Finland placed second on the table, collecting four gold medals amongst a total of eleven. Clas Thunberg won five of their medals, achieving a medal in each of the speed skating events he took part in; collecting three gold medals, one silver and one bronze. Eight of the competing nations achieved at least one gold medal, with only Belgium and the hosts, France, medalling without winning a gold medal. One medal was reallocated in 1974; during the games, Thorleif Haug of Norway had been awarded the bronze medal in ski jumping, along with his three gold medals. A Norwegian historian discovered that there had been a scoring error, and an American, Anders Haugen, had actually finished in third place. As Haug had died in 1934, his daughter presented Haugen, aged 83, with his medal.

In the official report, the classification of nations is ranked not by medals, but rather by "points", which were awarded for each position from first to sixth; not exclusively for gold, silver and bronze. Due to this, Czechoslovakia were included in the table ahead of Belgium, due to two fourth-place finishes, one fifth and one sixth. Italy were also present, in twelfth, for their solitary sixth place.

Medal table

The medal table is based on information provided by the IOC and is consistent with IOC convention in its published medal tables. By default, the table is ordered by the number of gold medals the athletes from a nation have won (in this context, a nation is an entity represented by a National Olympic Committee). The number of silver medals is taken into consideration next and then the number of bronze medals. If nations are still tied, equal ranking is given and they are listed alphabetically. Two bronze medals were awarded in the 500 metres speed skating event for the third place tie.

See also
 List of 1924 Winter Olympics medal winners

Notes

References

External links
 
 
 

Medal table
1924